Monsignor Giuseppe Placido Maria Nicolini O.S.B. (1877–1973), born Villazzano, Italy, was the Roman Catholic Bishop of Assisi from 1928 until 1973. Prior to serving as Bishop, he was ordained as a Benedictine priest in 1899 and was appointed Abbot of Santissima Trinità di Cava de’ Tirreni, Italy in 1919. During World War II, he established the Assisi Network which provided shelter to hundreds of Jews.

Rescue of Jews
When the Nazis began rounding up Jews during the Nazi Occupation of Italy, Nicolini ordered Father Aldo Brunacci to lead a rescue operation, which became known as the Assisi Network. Nicolini authorized the hiding of Jews in places that were regularly closed to outsiders by monastic regulations and his "Committee of Assistance" transformed Assisi into a shelter for many Jews, while assisting others to pass safely through the town to other places of safety. Sheltering places were arranged in 26 monasteries and convents, and false papers for transit were provided. Nicolini was recognized as Righteous among the Nations by Yad Vashem in 1977.

References

External links
 Giuseppe Placido Nicolini – his activity to save Jews' lives during the Holocaust, at Yad Vashem website

Catholic resistance to Nazi Germany
Catholic Righteous Among the Nations
Italian Righteous Among the Nations
Bishops in Umbria
1877 births
1973 deaths
Italian Benedictines
People from Trento
20th-century Italian Roman Catholic bishops